Annie may refer to:

People and fictional characters

 Annie (given name), a given name and a list of people and fictional characters with the name
 Annie (Malayalam actress) (born 1975), Indian actress who works in Malayalam-language films
 Annie (Telugu actress) (born 2001), Indian actress who works in Telugu-language films
 Annie (singer) (born 1977), Norwegian singer

Theatre and film

 Annie (musical), a 1977 musical
 Annie (1982 film)
 Annie (1982 film soundtrack)
 Annie: A Royal Adventure!, a 1995 telefilm sequel
 Annie (1999 film)
 Annie (1999 film soundtrack)
 Annie (2014 film)
 Annie (2014 film soundtrack)
 Annie (1976 film), a British-Italian film

Music
 Annie (Anne Murray album) (1972)
 "Annie" (song), a 1999 song by Our Lady Peace
 "Annie", a song by SafetySuit
 "Annie", a song by Pete Townshend from Rough Mix
 "Annie", a 1972 song by Sutherland Brothers
 "Annie", a 1995 song by Elastica from the album Elastica

Other uses
 Cyclone Annie (disambiguation)
 Annie (locomotive)
 Annie (sloop), a ship built in 1880
 Accelerator Neutrino Neutron Interaction Experiment (ANNIE)
 Annie Award, an award for animation
 Annie Creek, a stream in South Dakota
 Annie 30, an American sailboat design

See also
 
 
 Anni (disambiguation)
 Annie's Homegrown, a California-based organic food maker
 Annie's Mailbox, an advice column written by Ann Landers' former editors from 2002 to 2016
 M65 atomic cannon, nicknamed "Atomic Annie", an American towed artillery piece
Ann (disambiguation)
Anne (disambiguation)
Rescue Annie or Resusci Anne, a doll used to teach CPR/EAR